Lana Osiņina (born 5 October 2002) is a Latvian footballer who plays as a forward for Úrvalsdeild kvenna club ÍBV and the Latvia women's national team.

References

2002 births
Living people
Latvian women's footballers
Women's association football forwards
Rīgas FS players
Latvia women's youth international footballers
Latvia women's international footballers